Death Before Dishonor XVI was a two night professional wrestling event produced by Ring of Honor (ROH), which took place on September 28 and 29, 2018 at Orleans Arena in Paradise, Nevada. The first night was a pay-per-view broadcast, while night two was a set of TV tapings for the company's flagship program Ring of Honor Wrestling.

Wrestlers from New Japan Pro-Wrestling (NJPW) — with which ROH has a partnership — also appeared on the card.

Storylines
Death Before Dishonor XVI will feature professional wrestling matches, involving different wrestlers from pre-existing scripted feuds, plots, and storylines that played out on ROH's television programs. Wrestlers portrayed villains or heroes as they followed a series of events that built tension and culminated in a wrestling match or series of matches.

The main event of Death Before Dishonor XVI featured Jay Lethal defending the ROH World Championship against Will Ospreay. On August 25, 2018, during the Ring of Honor Wrestling tapings, Ospreay returned to ROH in a pre-taped vignette, challenging Lethal to a match for the ROH World Championship. Afterwards, Lethal accepted the match.

In the Women of Honor World Championship match, Sumie Sakai defended her title against Tenille Dashwood. On August 25, 2018, during the Ring of Honor Wrestling tapings, after Sakai defeated Tasha Steelz, Sakai stated that defeating Dashwood would validate her championship reign. Dashwood then came to the ring and accepted the challenge. Sakai had previously defeated Dashwood in the semifinals of the Women of Honor Championship on April 7 at Supercard of Honor XII.

Results
Night One (PPV)

Night Two (TV Tapings)

References

External links
rohwrestling.com/live/events/92818-death-dishonor-las-vegas-nv

2018 Ring of Honor pay-per-view events
2018 in Nevada
Events in Paradise, Nevada
Professional wrestling shows in the Las Vegas Valley
ROH Death Before Dishonor
September 2018 events in the United States